Tianjin FAW (officially Tianjin FAW Xiali Automobile Co., Ltd.) is an automobile company based in Tianjin, China and a subsidiary of FAW Group. Its principal activity is the design, development, manufacture and distribution of automobiles sold under the Xiali and Vita marques. It is listed on the Shenzhen Stock Exchange.

Tianjin FAW was founded in 1965 and was originally considered one of the "three smalls" of the Chinese automotive industry, together with Guangzhou Honda and Beijing. Tianjin FAW moved into third place in the Chinese market in 1997. By 2000 they were in second place, in spite of the low quality of their products. Production volumes were high due to the fact that many towns used Xiali cars as taxicabs. Many of the smaller towns in rural China had Xiali cars as taxicabs well into the second decade of the twenty-first century. Xiali parts were cheap and it was one of the cheapest cars to run in China. Due to their low running costs, Xiali cars in many towns survived as unofficial "black" taxies till well after they were replaced by other cars as legal taxies. Tianjin FAW has since lost market share to several new Chinese automobile manufacturers.

Tianjin FAW operates a joint venture with Toyota, Tianjin FAW Toyota Motor Co., Ltd., which produces Toyota passenger cars for the Chinese market including the Avalon, Corolla, Crown, Reiz and Vios.

History
Tianjin FAW's first product, debuting in 1965, was a copy of the famous Beijing Jeep called the Tianjin TJ210. Between 1973 and 1979 the Toyota look-alike Tianjin TJ740 was also built, although only 63 were finished.

In the 1980s, Tianjin's directors decided to look abroad for a joint venture to enable them to build modern small cars. In 1983, Daihatsu had been chosen as a partner, and in November 1984 the first vehicle rolled out from the works. At first, local parts content was a mere 8%, but this had jumped to 85% by the end of 1987. The first product was a locally built Daihatsu Hijet in 1984, followed by the Charade which began local assembly in 1986.

Production began at a modest level, with 2873 automobiles (Charade) and 9329 minivans (Hijet) assembled in 1988, for a total of 12,202 vehicles. This increased rapidly, to an annual total of nearly 88,000 cars by 1996.

Before the Toyota joint venture, Tianjin FAW produced the Tianjin Xiali TJ730 (based on the 1983 Daihatsu Charade) and then the TJ7100-TJ7131 hatchback and TJ7100U-TJ7131U sedan under the Xiali brand that was formed in August 1997. Xiali (夏利) is Chinese for "Charade". The TJ7100-series cars, based on the 1987 Charade. They were very popular in China as taxicabs throughout the 1980s and in the 1990s, the Chinese Volkswagen Jetta joined the taxi market followed by the Hyundai Sonata and Elantra in the 2000s. The Xiali taxi was retired from the taxi market in February 2006 in an effort to cut down pollution.

Production of the Daihatsu-based Xiali N3 ran from 2004 to 2012. Production at the Tianjin Xiali plant had shifted to more modern Toyota vehicles, for example the Xiali 2000 that was based on the Toyota Platz/Vitz but the production of the much cheaper Xiali outlived the Xiali 2000. Toyota also builds and sells vehicles in China under its own brand.

The Xiali brand was discontinued in 2015 and was replaced by the new brand called Junpai.

From 1984 to 2002, Tianjin FAW manufactured Hijet-based Daihatsu mini trucks in China rebranded as Huali Dafa. Currently Huali offers the first generation Daihatsu Terios and second generation Daihatsu Move.

FAW Tianjin also produces the Miles ZX40, an electric version of the Daihatsu Move which became the first Chinese-built vehicle sold in the United States when it was offered in mid-2006 by Miles Automotive Group.

Models

Current 

2014–present: Junpai D60, an SUV with a 1.5 litre engine as well as the 1.8 litre 2ZR-FE engine.
2016–present: Junpai A70, a compact sedan introduced in September 2016.
2018–present: Junpai A50, a sedan with a 1.5 litre engine
2018–present: Junpai CX65, a wagon. First car of the brand to get the new English company name Jumpal.

Past

1965: Tianjin TJ210 C, a transferred extended production of the Beijing BJ212
1973–1979: Tianjin TJ740, a Chinese copy of a Toyota sedan fitted with a 1.8 litre engine
1986.09–1988: Xiali TJ730, a hatchback based on the Daihatsu Charade (G11)
1984–2002: Huali Dafa, a locally produced Daihatsu Hijet originally known as the Tianjin TJ110. Was used as a popular taxicab. Available with the 843 cc CD engine and 4-speed manual gearbox.
1988–2000: Xiali TJ 7100, a hatchback based on the Daihatsu Charade (G100)
1997.12–1999: Xiali TJ 7100 A, a facelifted TJ 7100 hatchback
1999–2007: Xiali TJ 7101/TJ 7131, new name for the TJ 7100 A hatchback. Available with a 1.0 and 1.3 litre engine
1999–2003: Xiali TJ 7101 L/TJ 7131 L, a TJ 7101 hatchback lengthened by 8 cm. Available with a 1.0 and 1.3 litre engine
2003.05–2011: Xiali A Junya (Junior) (TJ 7101 A-TJ 7141 A), a slightly facelifted version of the existing hatchback range, new bumpers and some new engine options. 1,425 cc version since June 2005. Facelifted in March 2006, this and the Shenya were known as the "A+" until 2011
1990.10–2000: Xiali TJ 7100 U/TJ 7130 U, a sedan based on the Daihatsu Charade (G100)
1997.12–2000: Xiali TJ 7100 UA/TJ 7130 UA, a facelifted TJ 7100 U sedan. Available with a 1.1 and 1.3 litre engine
1999–2004: Xiali TJ 7101 UAL/TJ 7131 UAL, a Xiali TJ 7100 UA/TJ 7130 UA sedan lengthened by 8 cm. Available with a 1.1 and 1.3 litre engine
2001–2006: Xiali TJ 7101 U/TJ 7131 U, new name for the TJ 7101 UA sedan. Available with a 1.0 and 1.3 litre engine
2003.05–2011: Xiali A Shenya (Senior) (TJ 7101 AU-TJ 7141 AU), a slightly facelifted version of the existing sedan range released in May 2003 with new bumpers and some new engine options. 1,425 cc version since June 2005. Facelifted in March 2006, renamed as the A+ and remained in production until 2011
2002.12–2012: Xiali Vizi, a hatchback based on the Toyota Vitz. Known as 夏利威姿 in Chinese.
2000.12–2007: Xiali 2000 TJ 7136 U, a sedan based on the Toyota Platz
2002.09–2003.12: Xiali Yaku, a limited edition Xiali 2000 with an automatic gearbox
2004.03–2012: Xiali Vela CA 7156 U, a sister model of the Toyota Platz 2nd Gen
2004.08–2012: Xiali N3 (B series) TJ 7101 B-TJ 7131 BU, hatchbacks and sedans based on facelifted Xiali A series, with its origins in the Xiali N3, an updated sedan based on the previous Xiali series. This car was available in Mexico known as the F1 and was sold from 2008 to 2010. The N3 was facelifted in March 2008 and named as the N3+. 
2006.10–2011: Weizhi C1 (CA 7130 /CA 7140), an independent development also marketed as the FAW Vita launched in October 2006. The car is available with the 5A-FE and 8A-FE engines from Toyota.
2009.11–2014: Xiali N5 (TJ 7103 UE/TJ 7133 UE), a sedan based on the Xiali N3
2010–2012: Weizhi V2 (TJ 7137 E4S), a hatchback with a 1.3 litre engine.
2012–2015: Weizhi V5 (CA 7150 BUE), a facelifted Weizhi C1.
2013–2015: Xiali N7, a Mini SUV
2018–2019: Junpai D80, a SUV.

Model designation

U = sedanA = faceliftL = long wheelbase

Current cars

Former cars

References

External links
 Tianjin Xiali (in Chinese)
 Xiali Vela Homepage
 Xiali N3 homepage
 Toyota Official site (in Chinese)

Car manufacturers of China
FAW Group divisions and subsidiaries
Vehicle manufacturing companies established in 1965
Manufacturing companies based in Tianjin